The Puerto Rico women's national under-16 and under-17 basketball team, is controlled by the Puerto Rican Basketball Federation, abbreviated as FBPUR, and represents Puerto Rico in international under-16 and under-17 (under age 16 and under age 17) women's basketball competitions.

See also
 Puerto Rico national basketball team
 Puerto Rico national under-17 basketball team
 Puerto Rico women's national basketball team
 Puerto Rico women's national under-19 basketball team

References

External links
 Puerto Rico Basketball Federation

Women's national under-17 basketball teams
Basketball